This is a list of the Sangeet Natak Akademi awards for the Indian classical dance form of Kathak, as well as gurus and well-known performers.

Sangeet Natak Akademi awardees

Shambhu Maharaj 1955
Sunder Prasad 1959
Mohanrao Kallianpurkar 1962
Birju Maharaj 1964
Damayanti Joshi 1968
Sitara Devi 1969
Roshan Kumari 1975
Rohini Bhate 1979
Kumudini Lakhia 1982
Durga Lal 1984
Uma Sharma 1987
Maya Rao 1989
Rani Karnaa 1996
Shovana Narayan 1999-2000
Rajendra Gangani 2002
Sunayana Hazarilal Agarwal 2003
Saswati Sen 2004
Munna Shukla 2006
Geetanjali Lal 2007
Shashi Sankhla 2008
Prerana Shrimali 2009
Vijay Shankar 2012
Uma Dogra 2014
Jitendra Maharaj 2016
Puru Dadheech 2018

Padma awardees 
Shambhu Maharaj
Damayanti Joshi
Sitara Devi
Uma Sharma
Nataraj Gopi Krishna(dancer)Gopi
Roshan Kumari
Birju Maharaj
Kumudini Lakhia
Shovana Narayan
Sunayana Hazarilal
Rani Karnaa 
Puru Dadheech
Kamalini Asthana and Nalini Asthana

Gharana founders 
 Ishwari Prasad - Founder:Lucknow Gharana
 Raja Chakradhar Singh - Founder: Raigarh Gharana

Lucknow gharana 
The following is a list of the Gurus of the Lucknow Gharana, beginning with the disciples of Ishwari Prasad:
 Wajid Ali Shah (1822 – 1887, Nawab of Oudh and patron of the arts)
 Lachhu Maharaj
 Shambhu Maharaj
 Maya Rao
 Damayanti Joshi
 Birju Maharaj
 Arjun Mishra
 Guru Bandana Sen
 Sushmita Banerjee
 Maharaj Ghulam Hussain Kathak 
 Saswati Sen
 Vibha Dadheech
 Munna Shukla 
 Nandkishore Kapote
 Shila Mehta
 Prerana Deshpande
 Gauri Jog
 Sushmita Banerjee
 Deepa Devasena
 Manjari Chaturvedi
 Pali Chandra
 Priti Singh                     
  • Mahua Shankar

Jaipur gharana

 Sunder Prasad (Sundar Chunnilal Prasad)
 Puru Dadheech
 Mangala Bhatt

Benaras gharana
The following is a list of the gurus of the Benaras Gharana, beginning with the disciples of Janaki Prasad:
 Sitara Devi, daughter of Sukhdev
 Jitendra maharaj Disciple of Krishna Kumar maharaj 
 Kamalini Asthana and Nalini Asthana

Gurus (deceased) 
 Damayanti Joshi
 Rohini Bhate
 Chitresh Das
 Rani Karnaa
 Maya Rao
 Birju Maharaj
 Arjun Mishra

Current elder/senior gurus 
 Guru Bandana Sen
Roshan Kumari
Puru Dadheech
Nahid Siddiqui
Kumudini Lakhia
Maya Rao (1928-2014)
 Dr. Suchitra Harmalkar 
Nirupama Rajendra
Nandini Singh
Geetanjali Lal
Shama Bhate
Prerana Shrimali
Nandkishore Kapote
Saswati Sen
Rajendra Gangani
Shovana Narayan
Pali Chandra
Priti Singh
Ina Shah

Younger artists 
 Priti Singh
 Suchandra Banerjee
 Jaya Sharma
 Prerana Deshpande
 Manoj Maharaj Kathak
 Maryada Kulshreastha (Maya)
 Manisha Gulyani 
 Neha Pendse
 Shashwati Harmalkar 
 Akram Khan (dancer)
 Chitresh Das
 Satya Narayana Charka
 Cynthia Ling Lee
 Marami Medhi

References

 
India dance-related lists
Lists of dancers